The Heather Farr Player Award is an award given each year since 1994 by the LPGA Tour to an LPGA golfer "who, through her hard work, dedication and love of the game of golf, has demonstrated determination, perseverance and spirit in fulfilling her goals as a player."

It was established in the memory of Heather Farr, an LPGA player who died of breast cancer at the age of 28 in 1993.

Winners
 
1994 Heather Farr
1995 Shelley Hamlin
1996 Martha Nause
1997 Terry-Jo Myers
1998 Lorie Kane
1999 Nancy Scranton
2000 Brandie Burton
2001 Kris Tschetter
2002 Kim Williams
2003 Beth Daniel
2004 Colleen Walker
2005 Amy Read
2006 Se Ri Pak
2007 Lorena Ochoa
2008 Leta Lindley
2009 Catriona Matthew
2010–2011 No award
2012 Sophie Gustafson
2013 Reilley Rankin
2014 Lisa Ferrero
2015 Stephanie Meadow
2016 Ariya Jutanugarn
2017 Tiffany Joh
2018 Jessica Korda
2019 Suzann Pettersen
2020 No award
2021 Madelene Sagström

See also

 List of sports awards honoring women

References

External links
LPGA – Berg, Farr, Powell, and Zaharias Award Winners

Golf awards in the United States
LPGA Tour
Sports awards honoring women
Female golfers
Awards established in 1994
1994 establishments in the United States